Brendan McCarthy is a British artist and designer.

Brendan McCarthy may also refer to:

 Brendan McCarthy (American football) (1945–1997), American footballer
 Brendan McCarthy (boxer) (born 1947), Irish Olympic boxer
 Brendan McCarthy (producer), Irish film producer
 Brandon McCarthy (born 1983), American baseball pitcher